Aruba competed at the 2011 Pan American Games in Guadalajara, Mexico from October 14 to 30, 2011. Aruba competed with seventeen athletes in five sports.

Bowling

Aruba had qualified a women's team of 2 athletes.

Women
Individual

Pairs

Cycling

BMX
Aruba had qualified one male BMX cyclist.

Men

Swimming

Aruba had qualified three swimmers.

Men

Women

Synchronized swimming

Aruba had qualified a full team (a duet and a team). 9 athletes.

Taekwondo

Aruba had qualified a team of 2 male taekwondo athletes.

Men

References

Nations at the 2011 Pan American Games
P
2011